Dede One Day (born Peter Onwuzurike Onyehidelam; died 14 December 2015) was a Nigerian standup comedian and comic actor.

Life
Dede One Day was a native of Umuagwuru Mbieri in Imo State but was born and raised in Aba, a town in Abia State, Nigeria. His career hit the spotlight upon the subsequent release of his Laugh With Me comedy series.

Death
Dede One Day died in the early hours of 14 December 2015 after he slumped while performing at an event in Aba, following complications of hypertension.

Selected filmography

Keke Soldiers
Iron Pant
Mortuary attendant
Corporate Beggars
My Class Mate
Professional Beggars
Village Musicians
Senior Officer
Joseph Oro Nro
Village lawyer
Shoe shiner

References

2015 deaths
20th-century Nigerian male actors
21st-century Nigerian male actors
People from Imo State
People from Abia State
Nigerian male comedians
Igbo male actors
Year of birth missing
Nigerian stand-up comedians